Essex Township is located in Stark County, Illinois. As of the 2010 census, its population was 624 and it contained 303 housing units.

History
Essex Township is named for Isaac B. Essex, an early settler.

Geography

Demographics

References

External links
 US Census
 City-data.com
 Illinois State Archives

Townships in Stark County, Illinois
Peoria metropolitan area, Illinois
Townships in Illinois